A vehicle identification number (VIN) (also called a chassis number or frame number) is a unique code, including a serial number, used by the automotive industry to identify individual motor vehicles, towed vehicles, motorcycles, scooters and mopeds, as defined by the International Organization for Standardization in ISO 3779 (content and structure) and ISO 4030 (location and attachment).

There are vehicle history services in several countries that help potential car owners use VINs to find vehicles that are defective or have been written off.

History of the bodywork number 
VINs were first used in 1954 in the United States. From 1954 to 1981, there was no accepted standard for these numbers, so different manufacturers used different formats.

In 1981, the National Highway Traffic Safety Administration of the United States standardized the format. It required all on-road vehicles sold to contain a 17-character VIN, which does not include the letters O (o), I (i), and Q (q) (to avoid confusion with numerals 0, 1, and 9).

After the introduction of the ISO norm, the manufacturers which produced vehicles for the American market very quickly adjusted to this standard. The ISO introduced recommendations for applying the VIN standard and its structure, and the bodywork number was also used in Europe. However, the sets of information contained in it were introduced gradually. For example, Volkswagen started to encode bigger chunks of information during 1995-1997, and the control digit during 2009-2015 for selected models from the group. The VIN control digit is also used, although not in all brand-models. In the European vehicles, it can be found e.g. in Audi A1.

Classification 
There are at least four competing standards used to calculate the VIN.
 FMVSS 115, Part 565: Used in United States and Canada
 ISO 3779: Used in Europe and many other parts of the world
 SAE J853: Very similar to the ISO standard
 ADR 61/2 used in Australia, referring to ISO 3779 and 3780

Components
Modern VINs are based on two related standards, originally issued by the International Organization for Standardization (ISO) in 1979 and 1980: ISO 3779 and ISO 3780, respectively. Compatible but different implementations of these ISO standards have been adopted by the European Union and the United States.

The VIN comprises the following sections:

World manufacturer identifier
The first three characters uniquely identify the manufacturer of the vehicle using the world manufacturer identifier or WMI code. A manufacturer who builds fewer than 1,000 vehicles per year uses a 9 as the third digit, and the 12th, 13th and 14th position of the VIN for a second part of the identification. Some manufacturers use the third character as a code for a vehicle category (e.g., bus or truck), a division within a manufacturer, or both.

The Society of Automotive Engineers (SAE) in the US assigns WMIs to countries and manufacturers.

The first character of the WMI is typically the region in which the manufacturer is located although there are exceptions e.g. the WMI 7SA was assigned to Tesla Inc. in the United States in 2021. In practice, each is assigned to a country of manufacture, although in Europe the country where the continental headquarters is located can assign the WMI to all vehicles produced in that region (Example: Opel/Vauxhall cars whether produced in Germany, Spain, the United Kingdom or Poland carry a WMI of  because Adam Opel AG is based in Rüsselsheim, Germany).

In the notation below, assume that letters precede numbers and that zero is the last number. For example, 8X–82 denotes the range 8X, 8Y, 8Z, 81, 82, excluding 80.

Country or region codes

Vehicle descriptor section
The fourth to ninth positions in the VIN are the vehicle descriptor section or VDS. This is used, according to local regulations, to identify the vehicle type, and may include information on the automobile platform used, the model, and the body style. Each manufacturer has a unique system for using this field. Most manufacturers since the 1980s have used the eighth digit to identify the engine type whenever there is more than one engine choice for the vehicle. Example: for the 2007 Chevrolet Corvette, U is for a 6.0-liter V8 engine, and E is for a 7.0-liter V8.

North American check digits
One element that is inconsistent is the use of position nine as a check digit, compulsory for vehicles in North America and China, but not Europe.

Vehicle identifier section
The 10th to 17th positions are used as the vehicle identifier section or VIS. This is used by the manufacturer to identify the individual vehicle in question. This may include information on options installed or engine and transmission choices, but often is a simple sequential number. In North America, the last five digits must be numeric.

Model year encoding
One consistent element of the VIS is the 10th digit, which is required worldwide to encode the model year of the vehicle. Besides the three letters that are not allowed in the VIN itself (I, O and Q), the letters U and Z and the digit 0 are not used for the model year code. The year code is the model year for the vehicle.

The year 1980 was encoded by some manufacturers, especially General Motors and Chrysler, as "A" (since the 17-digit VIN was not mandatory until 1981, and the "A" or zero was in the manufacturer's pre-1981 placement in the VIN), yet Ford and AMC still used a zero for 1980. Subsequent years increment through the allowed letters, so that "Y" represents the year 2000. 2001 to 2009 are encoded as the digits 1 to 9, and subsequent years are encoded as "A", "B", "C", etc.

On April 30, 2008, the US National Highway Traffic Safety Administration adopted a final rule amending 49 CFR Part 565, "so that the current 17 character vehicle identification number (VIN) system, which has been in place for almost 30 years, can continue in use for at least another 30 years", in the process making several changes to the VIN requirements applicable to all motor vehicles manufactured for sale in the United States. There are three notable changes to the VIN structure that affect VIN deciphering systems:
 The make may only be identified after looking at positions one through three and another position, as determined by the manufacturer in the second section or fourth to eighth segment of the VIN.
 In order to identify the exact year in passenger cars and multipurpose passenger vehicles with a GVWR of 10,000 or less, one must read position 7 as well as position 10. If position seven is alphabetic, the model year in position 10 of VIN refers to a year in the range 2010–2039.
VIN characters 1–8 and 10 that were assigned from 1980 to 2009 can be repeated beginning with the 2010 model year.

Plant code
Compulsory in North America and China is the use of the 11th character to identify the assembly plant at which the vehicle was built. Each manufacturer has its own set of plant codes.

Production number
In the United States and China, the 12th to 17th digits are the vehicle's serial or production number. This is unique to each vehicle, and every manufacturer uses its own sequence.

Check-digit calculation

A check-digit validation is used for all road vehicles sold in the United States and Canada.

When trying to validate a VIN with a check digit, first either (a) remove the check digit for the purpose of calculation or (b) use a weight of zero (see below) to cancel it out. The original value of the check digit is then compared with the calculated value. If the calculated value is 0–9, the check digit must match the calculated value. If the calculated value is 10, the check digit must be X. If the two values do not match (and there was no error in the calculation), then there is a mistake in the VIN. The VINs in the Porsche image, and the GM-T body image, do not pass the North American check-digit verification.

Transliterating the numbers
Transliteration consists of removing all of the letters, and replacing them with their appropriate numerical counterparts. These numerical alternatives (based on IBM's EBCDIC) are in the following chart. I, O, and Q are not allowed in a valid VIN; for this chart, they have been filled in with N/A (not applicable). Numerical digits use their own values.

S is 2, and not 1. There is no left-alignment linearity.

Weights used in calculation
The following is the weight factor for each position in the VIN. The 9th position is that of the check digit. It has been substituted with a 0, which will cancel it out in the multiplication step.

Worked example
Consider the hypothetical VIN , where the underscore will be the check digit.

 The VIN's value is calculated from the above transliteration table. This number is used in the rest of the calculation.
 Copy the weights from the weight factor row above.
 The products row is the result of the multiplication of the columns in the Value and Weight rows.
 The products (8, 28, 48, 35 ... 24, 16) are all added together to yield a sum, 351.
 Find the remainder after dividing by 11351 MOD 11 = 10351 ÷ 11 = 31
 The remainder is the check digit. If the remainder is 10, the check digit is X. In this example, the remainder is 10, so the check digit is transliterated as X.

With a check digit of X, the VIN  is written .

A VIN with straight-ones (seventeen consecutive 1s) has the nice feature that its check digit 1 matches the calculated value 1. This is because a value of one multiplied by 89 (sum of weights) is 89, and 89 divided by 11 is 8 with remainder ; thus 1 is the check digit. This is a way to test a VIN-check algorithm.

VIN scanning
The VIN is marked in multiple locations; normally in the lower corner of the windshield on the driver's side, under the bonnet next to latch, at the front end of the vehicle frame, and inside the door pillar on the driver's side. On newer vehicles VINs may be optically read with barcode scanners or digital cameras, or digitally read via OBD-II. There are smartphone applications that can pass the VIN to websites to decode the VIN.

List of common WMI
The Society of Automotive Engineers (SAE) assigns the WMI (world manufacturer identifier) to countries and manufacturers. The following list shows a selection of world manufacturer codes.

Note: Vehicles to be registered in Australia without a 17 character VIN

See also
 Builder's plate
 Danish bicycle VIN-system
 Engine number
 Name plate
 Serial number
 VIN etching
 RPO Code
 VIN cloning

References

External links

 ISO 3779:2009
 FMVSS 115, Part 565

Automotive technologies
Trade and industrial classification systems
1981 introductions
Vehicle security systems
Country codes